In the People's Republic of China since 1967, the terms "ultra-left" and "left communist" refers to political theory and practice self-defined as further "left" than that of the central Maoist leaders at the height of the Great Proletarian Cultural Revolution (GPCR). The terms are also used retroactively to describe some early 20th century Chinese anarchist orientations. As a slur, the Chinese Communist Party (CCP) has used the term "ultra-left" more broadly to denounce any orientation it considers further "left" than the party line. According to the latter usage, the CCP Central Committee denounced in 1978 as "ultra-left"  of Mao Zedong from 1956 until his death in 1976. This article refers only to 1) the self-defined ultra-left of the GPCR; and 2) more recent theoretical trends drawing inspiration from the GPCR ultra-left, China's anarchist legacy and international "left communist" traditions.

GPCR ultra-left 

"Ultra-left" refers to those Marxist and anarchist GPCR rebel positions that diverged from the central Maoist line by identifying an antagonistic contradiction between the CCP-PRC party-state itself and the masses of workers and "peasants" conceived as a single proletarian class divorced from any meaningful control over production or distribution. Whereas the central Maoist line maintained that the masses controlled the means of production through the party's mediation, the ultra-left argued that the objective interests of bureaucrats were structurally determined by the centralist state-form in direct opposition to the objective interests of the masses, regardless of however "red" a given bureaucrat's "thought" might be. Whereas the central Maoist leaders encouraged the masses to criticize reactionary "ideas" and "habits" among the alleged 5% of bad cadres, giving them a chance to "turn over a new leaf" after they had undergone "thought reform", the ultra-left argued that "cultural revolution" had to give way to "political revolution" in which "one class overthrows another class". The masses could achieve democratic control over production and distribution only through "a new political power of the Paris Commune type". This meant that mass delegates subject to immediate recall and a universal salary would take over all the tasks necessary for organizing production and distribution, and all other bureaucratic posts would be abolished, including the military and police, which would give way to an armed citizenry. This revolution would necessarily involve general strikes, mutinies, weapons seizures and ultimately the merging of the Chinese revolution with a global communist revolution.

When the central Maoist leaders launched the GPCR in the spring of 1966, they launched a campaign for students and academics to criticize "bourgeois" or otherwise "counter-revolutionary" ideas within China's "superstructural" apparatus. As the Central Committee put it in August: Although the bourgeoisie has been overthrown, it is still trying to use the old ideas, culture, customs, habits, practices, traditions, philosophies, and thinking of the exploiting classes to corrupt the masses, capture their minds and endeavour to stage a comeback. The proletariat must do the exact opposite: it must meet head-on every challenge of the bourgeoisie in the ideological field and use the new ideas, culture, customs and habits of the proletariat to change the mental outlook of the whole of society. At present, our objective is to struggle against and overthrow those persons in authority who are taking the capitalist road, to criticize and repudiate the reactionary bourgeois academic 'authorities' and the ideology of the bourgeoisie and all other exploiting classes and to transform education, literature and art and all other parts of the superstructure not in correspondence with the socialist economic base, so as to facilitate the consolidation and development of the socialist system.

Although the 16 Points called on not only students but also "the masses of the workers, peasants, soldiers, revolutionary intellectuals, and revolutionary cadres" to carry out this struggle and although it encouraged activists to "institute a system of general elections, like that of the Paris Commune, for electing members to the Cultural Revolutionary groups and committees and delegates to the Cultural Revolutionary congresses", this and other proof of the central Maoist leaders made clear that this was to be wen (文) struggle rather than a wu (武) struggle. The leaders used these terms to emphasize that "martial" (wu) or physical violence should be avoided in favor of "verbal" (wen) struggle (big-character posters, debates, rallies and so on); though the 16 Points announced the GPCR, a great political revolution, armed struggle or challenge towards armies was not excepted. The rationale was that China's economic structure or "base" had already completed its transition to socialist productive relations (Mao had announced this good news in 1956), so now the next logical step before full communization was to complete the superstructural transformation. After the conservative Lin Biao made a failed coup, Mao recognized: "Even now China practices an eight-grade wage system, distribution according to work and exchange through money, and in all this differs very little from the old society. What is different is that the system of ownership has been changed. Our country at present practices a commodity system, the wage system is unequal, too, as in the eight-grade wage scale, and so forth. Under the dictatorship of the proletariat such things can only be restricted. Therefore, if people like Lin Biao come to power, it will be quite easy for them to rig up the capitalist system. That is why we should do more reading of Marxist-Leninist works". Zhang Chunqiao took some measures on the direct management of workers and peasants in Shanghai.

When in late 1966 over a million workers in Shanghai extended their activism into a general strike calling for improved salaries and democratic control over workplace management and city governance, Maoist worker representatives such as Wang Hongwen criticized some demands as "economistic" violation (which referred to another strategy of capitalist-roader Cao Diqiu to bribe workers and cause crisis) of point 14 of the 16 Points: "embrace the revolution while stimulating production (抓革命，促生产)". With some police assistance, these representatives managed to silence the more radical rank-and-file demands (called "far-rightist under a leftist form") and absorb their energy into the nominal January Storm, which replaced the city government and party committee with a Shanghai People's Commune ruled by Wang and Zhang Chunqiao. Some intransigent rebels called for democratic control over the Commune and even the abolition of all "heads". When Mao heard of this, he told Zhang to transform the Commune into a revolutionary committee in which mass representatives would share power with army and party representatives and recommended that this model of "power seizure" be propagated throughout China lest people get the wrong idea from Shanghai's invocation of the Paris Commune. Thus marched the People's Liberation Army onto the stage of GPCR mass politics and thus began what the ultra-left would later call the February Adverse Current.

It was out of this momentary radicalization of GPCR mass politics and its sudden suppression and redirection that the ultra-left currents were born under the direct order from Zhou Enlai, first independently within rebel groups scattered throughout China, then by late 1967 in increasing dialogue until their suppression during the following years. The earliest record GPCR scholar Wang Shaoguang has found of something resembling an ultra-left position is an open letter from two high school students to Lin Biao, published under the pseudonym Yilin-Dixi in November 1966. Whereas Lin had recently sought to curb Red Guard rebellion by interpreting Mao's "Bombard the Headquarters" to mean "bombard a few capitalist roaders" as opposed to "bombard our proletarian headquarters", Yilin-Dixi argued that it was the so-called "proletarian headquarters" itself that had "become obsolete" and needed to be "reformed", saying: "We must create a whole new state machinery to replace the old one".

The Shengwulian was a self-styled ultraleft group, and was the GPCR's most famous such group. It sought to emulate the Paris Commune as the historical example of popular power and argued that China's "new bureaucratic bourgeoisie" would have to be destroyed to establish a genuinely egalitarian society. The group's significant political writings include its Program and Yang Xiguang's "Whither China?"  Whither China? argued that the central conflict in China during the Cultural Revolution was not between Mao Zedong's proponents and opponents, or between the proletariat and the former wealthy, but instead between the masses and a "Red capitalist class" that was "decadent" and impeding historical progress.

See also 
 Anarchism in China
 Mao-Spontex
 Maoism

Notes

Further reading 
 The 70s Collective, ed. 1996. China: The Revolution is Dead, Long Live the Revolution. Montreal: Black Rose Books. 
 Chen Erjin. 1984. Crossroads Socialism: An Unofficial Manifesto for Proletarian Democracy. Trans. Robin Munro. London: Verso.
 Mehnert, Klaus, ed. 1969. Peking and the New Left: At Home and Abroad. Berkeley: University of California Press.
 Meisner, Maurice. 1999. Mao's China and After: A History of the People's Republic, Third Edition. New York: The Free Press. 
 Wang Shaoguang. 1995. The Failure of Charisma: The Cultural Revolution in Wuhan. Oxford: Oxford University Press.

External links 
 Communist Left on China
 "The rise and suppression of the 'ultra-left' in the Chinese cultural revolution" by Pete Brown
 "'New Trends of Thought' on the Cultural Revolution" by Wang Shaoguang
 "Rethinking 'Capitalist Restoration' in China" by Yiching Wu
 宋永毅、孙大进编. 1997. 《文化大革命中的异端思潮》. 香港:田园书屋.
 《论新思潮》，四三派（ ?）著
 《中国向何处去？》，省无联（杨曦光）著
 《无产阶级文化大革命中各种派别的分析》，北决扬（ 杨 Xiulin）著
 《特权论》（《论无产阶级民主革命》），陈泱潮（陈尔晋）著
 《从阶级关系反思中国的“资本主义复辟”》，吴一庆著
 《“文革”为什么结束？》，韩少功 (陈益南《一个工人的"文革"》的序言)

Chinese New Left
Communism in China
Cultural Revolution
Cold War history of China
Left communism
Politics of China
Maoism in China